A referendum on the introduction of prohibition was held in Newfoundland on 4 November 1915. It would prohibit unauthorised people from possessing or consuming any drinks with an alcohol content of more than 2%. 

The rules required that at least 40% of registered voters vote in favour of the proposal for it to pass. With 24,956 voting in favour, the quorum of 24,581 was narrowly passed, and prohibition was introduced on 1 January 1917. It remained in force until 1924, when a quota system for purchasing alcoholic drinks was introduced. That was scrapped on 31 March 1966.

Results

References

Alcohol in Newfoundland and Labrador
1915 referendums
1915 in Newfoundland
Referendums in the Dominion of Newfoundland
Canadian prohibition referendums
November 1915 events